An inland port is a port on an inland waterway, such as a river, lake, or canal, which may or may not be connected to the sea. The term "inland port" is also used to refer to a dry port.

Examples
The United States Army Corps of Engineers publishes biannually a list of such locations and for this purpose states that "inland ports" are ports that are located on rivers and do not handle deep draft ship traffic. The list includes ports such as St. Louis, Cincinnati, Pittsburgh, Kansas City, and Memphis.
A dense network of inland waterways including ports exists also in Europe (France, Germany, Poland, Russia, the United Kingdom and the Benelux countries), as well as in China and Brazil.

List of inland waterway ports

Africa
  : Port of Boma, Boma, Democratic Republic of the Congo, Congo River
  : Port of Ilebo, Ilebo, Democratic Republic of the Congo, Kasai River
  : Port of Matadi, Matadi, Democratic Republic of the Congo, Congo River
  : Port of Kinshasa, Kinshasa, Democratic Republic of the Congo, Congo River
  : Port of Kisangani, Kisangani, Democratic Republic of the Congo, Congo River
  : Port of Brazzaville, Brazzaville, Republic of the Congo
  : Inland port of Ismaïlia on the Suez Canal, Ismailia, Egypt
  : Mlawula Inland Port, Mlawula, eSwatini (Proposed)
  : Boankra
  : Kisumu Inland Port, Kisumu, Kenya, on Lake Victoria
  : Kenitra Inland Port, Kenitra, Morocco, on Sebou River
  : Juba Inland Port, Juba, South Sudan, on the White Nile River
  : Bukoba Inland Port, Bukoba, Tanzania, on Lake Victoria
  : Mwanza Inland Port, Mwanza, Tanzania, on Lake Victoria
  : Kigoma Inland Port, Kigoma, Tanzania, on Lake Tanganyika
  : Bukasa Inland Port, Kira Town, Uganda, on Lake Victoria
  : Jinja Inland Port, Jinja, on Lake Victoria
  : Port Bell Inland Port, Port Bell, Uganda on Lake Victoria
  : Mpulungu Inland Port, Mpulungu, Zambia on Lake Tanganyika

Asia

Inland Rivers

Europe

Inland Rivers

  : Runcorn Docks, England, United Kingdom, on the Manchester Ship Canal
  : Weston Point Docks, England, United Kingdom, on the Manchester Ship Canal

  : Harbours in Vienna, Vienna, Austria, on Danube River
  : Port of Ghent, Ghent, Belgium, on Schelde River, Leie River and Ghent–Terneuzen Canal
  : Port of Liège, Liège, Belgium, on Meuse River and Meuse Canals
  : Port of Lappeenranta, Lappeenranta, South Karelia, Finland, on Lake Saimaa.
  : Port of Budapest, Germany, on Danube
  : Port of Waterford, Waterford, Ireland, on River Suir
  : Mertert on Moselle River.
  : North- and East channel port Nijmegen, Gelderland, Netherlands, on Waal River.
  : Port of Warsaw, Poland, on Vistula
  : Port of Kolomna, Moscow Oblast, Russia, on Oka River
  : Port of Moscow, North River Terminal, South River Terminal, Moscow, Russia, on Moskva River and Moscow Canal
  : Port of Belgrade, Belgrade, Serbia, on Danube
  : Port of Bratislava, Bratislava, Slovakia on Danube River 
  : Port of Seville, Seville, Spain, on River Guadalquivir
  : Karlstad hamn Karlstad, Värmlands län, Sweden, on Klarälven.
  : Port of Basel, Switzerland, on Rhine.
  : Dnipro River Port, Dnipro, Ukraine, on Dnieper.
  : Kyiv River Port, Ukraine, on Dnieper.

North America

Great Lakes

Rivers and inland

South America
  : San Lorenzo-Puerto General San Martín Port Complex, San Lorenzo and Puerto General San Martín, Santa Fe, Argentina, on Paraná River
  : Port of Rosario, Rosario, Santa Fe, Argentina, on Paraná River
  : Port of San Nicolás de los Arroyos, San Nicolás de los Arroyos, Buenos Aires (province), Argentina, on Paraná River 
  : Puerto Aguirre, Puerto Quijarro, Bolivia, on Tamengo Canal
  : Puerto Busch, Bolivia, on Paraguay River 
  : Port of Guayaramerín, Guayaramerín, Bolivia, on Mamoré River
  : Port of Riberalta, Riberalta, Bolivia on Madre de Dios River and Beni River
  : Port of Porto Alegre, Porto Alegre, Rio Grande do Sul, Brazil, on Guaíba Lake
  : Port of Porto Velho, Porto Velho, Rondônia, Brazil, on Madeira River
  : Port of Manaus, Manaus, Amazonas, Brazil, on Rio Negro
  : Port of Santana, Santana, Amapá, Brazil, on Amazon River
  : Port of Santarém, Santarém, Pará, Brazil, on Tapajós and Amazon rivers
  : Port of Asunción, Asunción, Paraguay, on Paraguay River
  : Port of Encarnación, Encarnación, Itapúa Department, Paraguay, on Paraná River
  : Port of San Antonio, San Antonio, Central Department, Paraguay, on Paraguay River
  : Port of Villeta, Villeta, Central Department, Paraguay, on Paraguay River

See also
Dry port
List of dry ports of Pakistan
Sea port

Notes
 Canada ranking from Transport Canada.
 Saint Lawrence Seaway distances from Seaway Handbook.
 United States ranking from American Association of Port Authorities.
 Upper Mississippi River distances from U.S. Army Corps of Engineers.
 Lower Mississippi River distances from U.S. Army Corps of Engineers.
 Ohio River distances from U.S. Army Corps of Engineers.
 Missouri River distances from U.S. Army Corps of Engineers.
 Mississippi Basin ports marked.
 Some ports were part of the Dubai Ports World controversy.

References

Intermodal transport
Ports and harbours
Water transport
Lists of ports